George DeTitta Sr.  (born November 26, 1930) is an American set decorator. He was nominated for an Academy Award in the category Best Art Direction for the film Ragtime.

Selected filmography
 Ragtime (1981)

References

External links

American set decorators
1930 births
Living people